The Peacock Flies Southeast, originally An Old Poem Written for Jiao Zhongqing's Wife (古詩為焦仲卿妻作), is the earliest long narrative gushi (古詩, a kind of poem) in the history of Chinese literature.  It is called one of the two best yuefu (樂府), the other being Ballad of Mulan (木蘭辭).

In the poem, Liu Lanzhi (劉蘭芝) married Jiao Zhongqing (焦仲卿), but Jiao’s mother made them divorce because she didn't like Liu. Liu's brother made her marry another man after she went back.  In the end, both Liu and Jiao committed suicide before Liu's second wedding.

This poem is collected in Yuefu Shi Ji (樂府詩集) by Guo Maoqian.

References 

Chinese poetry